Dolichopus festivus is a species of long-legged fly in the family Dolichopodidae.

References 

festivus
Taxa named by Alexander Henry Haliday
Insects described in 1832